Anthony Creek may refer to:

Anthony Creek (Missouri), a stream in Missouri
Anthony Creek (Greenbrier River), a stream in West Virginia